Ploetz may refer to:

 Alfred Ploetz, German physician, biologist and eugenicist.
 Der Große Ploetz, German encyclopedia of world history.
 Karl Ploetz, German author.
 Yvonne Ploetz, German politician.

Plötz
 Plötz, municipality in the Saalekreis district, Saxony-Anhalt, Germany.
 Carl Plötz, German entomologist.
 Hans-Joachim Plötz, a former professional tennis player from Germany.